, complete name , widely known in Japan as Dewi Fujin (デヴィ夫人, Lady Dewi, Madame Dewi), is a Japanese-born Indonesian businesswoman, socialite, television personality and philanthropist. She was one of the wives of the first President of Indonesia, Sukarno.

Biography 

Naoko Nemoto was born on February 6, 1940, in Tokyo. Nemoto had a younger brother, and a mother who was constantly sick. Her father was a carpenter, who passed away when she was 16. To make ends meet, Nemoto worked at a famous club named "Copacabana".

In 1959, Nemoto, who was 19, met Sukarno, who was 39 years her senior, at the Ginza hostess bar in Tokyo, near the Imperial Hotel. Nemoto was an arts student and entertainer, while the latter was on a state visit to Japan.

Naoko married Sukarno in Indonesia in 1962 and converted to Islam. Sukarno gave her the Indonesian name "Ratna Sari Dewi Sukarno"; derived from Javanese-Sanskrit which means "the jewel essence of a goddess". They had one daughter, Kartika (born March 11, 1967, and is now going by the name "Carina"), who was Sukarno's eighth child. Sukarno was eventually overthrown by General Suharto in 1967 and died three years later.

The widowed Dewi Sukarno moved to Europe after Sukarno's ousting and has since lived in different countries, including France, Switzerland, and the United States. As of 2008, she has returned to Japan and lives in Shibuya, Tokyo, where she lives in her memorabilia-filled residence.

Dewi Sukarno is known for her outspoken personality. In Japan, she is commonly referred to simply as  rather than her full name. She made appearances in the news media after the January 2008 death of her husband's successor, Suharto, blaming him for instituting a repressive regime and likening him to Cambodian despot Pol Pot.

As of 2012, Dewi Sukarno enjoys caring for her 16 dogs and her cosmetics business. She has her own charity business that is often scrutinized by the National Tax Agency. She now makes a living doing part-time jobs, appearing on Japanese television and has served as a judge for a beauty contest, as in the 2005 Miss International pageant held in Tokyo. She is well known for her sculpted beauty and often claims to have not had the facelifts and plastic surgery that her doctor has rumored performing.

She remains an Indonesian citizen, being registered on the Permanent Elector's Roll (Daftar Pemilih Tetap) of the Indonesian Embassy at Tokyo as of 2008. However, she has not exercised her right to vote. In an interview with Desi Anwar of CNN Indonesia, she had reservations about being known solely as Sukarno's widow 40 years after his death. However, she expressed the intention to keep her Indonesian nationality - stating that an Indonesian passport was the only way she could freely travel to and from e.g. Blitar (where Sukarno's resting place is), i.e. as an Indonesian citizen.

Controversies 
In January 1992, Dewi became involved in a much-publicised altercation at a party in Aspen, Colorado, United States with fellow international socialite and heiress, Minnie Osmeña. A granddaughter of a former President of the Philippines, Osmeña reportedly commented on Dewi's past, and the spat culminated in Dewi hitting Osmeña's face with a wine glass. Osmeña needed 37 stitches to seal the gash, while Dewi was later detained for 34 days in Aspen for disorderly conduct. Dewi and Osmeña had already been hostile to each other after an exchange at an earlier party months before, where Dewi was heard to laugh at Osmeña's political plans (among which was to run for Vice-President of the Philippines).

Two years later, she posed for a book of photographs that was published in her native Japan (well known as "Madame de Syuga"). Some of the images featured her partially naked, and others showed what appeared to be tattoo-like body art. The book, while not distributed in Indonesia, was immediately banned, and many Indonesians felt offended by what was perceived to be a disgrace of Sukarno's name and legacy.

Political activities 
Since the overthrow of Sukarno, Dewi has had little involvement with Indonesian politics. She has worked with the United Nations Environmental Program (UNEP), and has expressed the wish to help refugees as well as people living under regimes like North Korea. When asked to comment about the reign of her stepdaughter, Megawati, all she replied was, "I think Megawati is gradually doing whatever she can. It's not easy being a Muslim woman president."

Filmography
PriPara Mi~nna no Akogare Let's Go PriPari (2016) as Ploria Ōkanda (voice)
 Idol Time PriPara (2017) as Ploria Ōkanda (voice, episode 39)
The Confidence Man JP: Episode of the Princess (2020)

References 

 Cited sources

External links 

 Dewi Sukarno, JapanZone
 

1940 births
Living people
Businesspeople from Tokyo
First ladies and gentlemen of Indonesia
Dewi
Indonesia–Japan relations
Japanese chief executives
Japanese cosmetics businesspeople
Japanese expatriates in France
Japanese expatriates in Indonesia
Japanese expatriates in Switzerland
Japanese expatriates in the United States
Japanese people imprisoned abroad
Japanese philanthropists
Japanese socialites
Japanese television personalities
People convicted of assault
Prisoners and detainees of Colorado
Converts to Islam
Japanese Muslims